Mount Lebanon Methodist Episcopal Church, also known as Mount Lebanon United Methodist Church, is a historic Methodist Episcopal church located at 850 Mount Lebanon Road in Wilmington, New Castle County, Delaware. It was built in 1834, and is a stuccoed stone structure in a Late Gothic Revival style. It measures , and has a steep gable roof and frame vestibule added in 1873. Adjacent to the church is a contributing cemetery containing approximately 150 tombstones dating from 1840.

It was added to the National Register of Historic Places in 1984.

References

External links
 

United Methodist churches in Delaware
Gothic Revival church buildings in Delaware
Churches completed in 1834
19th-century Methodist church buildings in the United States
Churches in Wilmington, Delaware
Churches on the National Register of Historic Places in Delaware
National Register of Historic Places in Wilmington, Delaware
Cemeteries on the National Register of Historic Places in Delaware